Maria Antonia Scalera Stellini (5 February 1634 – 21 September 1704) was a 17th-century Italian poet and playwright.

Life 
Born into a modest family in Apulia, in southern Italy, Scalera spent her youth in a convent. Following the wishes of her family, she left the convent to be married, but was soon widowed with two children. She remarried the Tuscan Silvestro Stellini, an official of Prince Agostino Chigi, a nephew of Pope Alexander VII, and went to live in their palaces at Ariccia and in Rome. Her poetic works qualified her to be received in the Academy of Arcadia on June 20, 1694, where she was named "Aricia Gnateatide".

Works 
In 1677, in Rome, she published a collection of poems in two volumes entitled Li divertimenti poetici ("The poetic entertainments"), which was reprinted in 1706. She also published the plays and musical dramas La Tirannide abbattuta dal trionfo della fede, Serenata spirituale, La ninfa del Tebro, Il trionfo di sant'Agata and Il Coraspe redivivo. The latter was staged in Ariccia in 1683.

References

Sources 
Patrizia Guida, Scrittrici di Puglia. Percorsi storiografici femminili dal XVI al XX secolo, (Biblioteca di cultura pugliese), Congedo Editore, Galatina 2008, pp. 74–79.
Michele Orlando, "Li Divertimenti poetici" di Maria Antonia Scalera Stellini tra ludus letterario e ripiegamento devoto. Problemi, aspetti formali, temi, in «Annali della Facoltà di Lettere e Filosofia dell'Università degli Studi di Bari», XLVII (2004), pp. 293–316.

External links 
 Works by Scalera Stellini in the National library catalogue of Italy

Italian literature
Members of the Academy of Arcadians
Italian women poets
17th-century Italian women writers
17th-century writers
1634 births
1704 deaths
Italian women dramatists and playwrights